Lakeside Joondalup Shopping City is a major shopping centre located in Joondalup, a suburb in the north of Perth. It is adjacent to the Joondalup railway station, and is currently the third largest shopping centre in Western Australia after Westfield Carousel and Karrinyup Shopping Centre. The centre contains three major Australian supermarkets, Woolworths, Coles and Aldi, three major discount department stores, Big W, Kmart and Target, and the department store Myer.

History and development

Construction of the centre commenced in 1991, and it opened in late November 1994. It celebrated its 10-year anniversary in 2004.

Redevelopments
The centre has undergone a number of relevant extensions and developments since opening.

Stage 1
The cinema, originally opened as a Greater Union, was constructed on top of the Joondalup Line railway reserve and opened in 1998. In 2004, the cinema was sold to Grand Cinemas.

Stage 2
In 1999 the centre added a Target department store to the south-west corner. The area was originally left vacant and was secured until the construction phase began.

Stage 3
Lakeside Joondalup Shopping City was developed extensively between 2006 and 2007, expanding to about twice of its original size. The redevelopment was completed in late 2008.

Valued at A$116 million in 2006, the expansion included a new major supermarket, department store and some 100 speciality stores, as well as adding a four-storey parking structure of 1,710 new car bays located on the south eastern side of the site. The new extensions connect with the existing centre via an enclosed area over Station Square. As part of the extension, ING Real Estate's existing "air rights lease" over the railway line was converted to freehold title. It was a condition of development approval that public access be maintained from the commencement to cessation of rail services at the adjoining Joondalup Interchange.

The first portion of Stage 3 was opened to the public on 7 December 2007. This portion included the Fashion Mall (located within the old East Mall area), the Station Square precinct, the relocated Food Court, as well as a small selection of speciality retail stores.

The second portion of Stage 3 was opened to the public in April 2008. This allowed access between the lower part of the centre to the adjoining road of Boas Avenue. The remainder of Stage 3 was opened to the public on 4 December 2008.

In 2010 the centre was sold as part of the ING Retail Property Fund to a consortium led by Lend Lease Group and the Australian Government Future Fund in a deal worth $1.4 billion.

Stage 4
In 2012 the centre began further expansion of the centre to the south. The first stage of the expansion opened in March 2014, and included a new multi-storey carpark (800 bays) and 20 specialty stores. This was shortly followed by the opening of an expanded Coles supermarket. The second stage, consisting of a new Myer department store, a new fashion mall, second food court and alfresco dining precinct, opened in November 2014. In December 2014, a new food court opened above the existing food court adding six new food tenants to the centre.

A third stage of expansion continued throughout 2015. This stage included a number of new food establishments, bars, and specialty fashion retailers.

Architectural features
The most striking feature of the centre is the main area known as The Great Space. It consists of a number of white tent-like structures covering the major area, with a large inbuild centre stage and display area located in the middle. Also inside Lakeside Joondalup Shopping City are many variety stores featured within the "Great Space" which offer a variety of different products to centre customers.

Transport
Adjoining the centre is the Joondalup Interchange, opened in 1993. The station services the Joondalup Line as well as numerous bus routes covering suburbs from Whitfords to Clarkson and beyond. Further to this, the station is also a member of the TransWA network.

Facilities
The centre has a number of restrooms facilities located at entry points and lifts throughout the two story section and carparks. The shopping centre also has taxi ranks and set downs at the north, east and west entrances. All are wheelchair accessible.

Major Precincts

The centre is divided into a number of areas including:
 The Great Space
 East Mall 
 Fashion Mall
 Food Court
 Fresh Food Court
 Station Square
 Fresco
 South Mall
 North Mall
 West Mall

References

External links

Shopping centres in Perth, Western Australia
Shopping malls established in 1994
Joondalup
1994 establishments in Australia